Ptychotrygonidae is an extinct family of cartilaginous fish from the Late Cretaceous belonging to the suborder Sclerorhynchoidei. This family contains the genera Archingeayia, Asflapristis, Ptychotrygon, Ptychotrygonoides, and Texatrygon.

References

Prehistoric cartilaginous fish families
Rajiformes